Scratch Massive is a French DJ duo, composed of Maud Geffray and Sébastien Chenut.

Biography 
Scratch Massive was formed in 1994, and is active in the French electronic music scene, and are DJs as well as composers and music producers. In 2001, the duo released two EPs, La Face Cachée and Icebreaker, which Pascal Bertin referred to as "little bombs", and which have been remixed numerous times. 

In 2003, Scratch Massive released their first album, titled Enemy & Lovers. According to Joseph Ghosn, the album departs from the group's techno origins, incorporating pop and rock sounds, even moving towards psychedelic sound. Pascal Bertin described it as "an electronic music album which benefits from channeling powerful rock energy". The album was produced by Cristian Vogel of Super Collider who, according to Ghosn "brightens the overall sound of the album" and provides a "dirty and hallucinogenic" consistency.

In 2007, both the second album, Time, and Broken English, were released, the latter being a soundtrack composed for the first feature film of the same name by Zoe Cassavetes. The album, Time, was mastered by Moritz von Oswald, and features a cover version of The Cure's Three Imaginary Boys. According to Matthieu Choquet, the album "is more electro than its predecessors" and features new wave influences.

Their third album, Nuit de Rêve (Night of Dreams), was released in 2011. The single, Paris, featuring  Daniel Ágúst Haraldsson from the group GusGus, benefitted from a music video directed by Zoe Cassavetes in which she featured Cécile Cassel. In 2013, the live album, Communion was published, featuring tracks from Nuit de Rêve.

The fourth album, Garden of Love containing the track Last Dance which Maud Geffray sings on, was released in 2018. 

In 2021, to commemorate the tenth anniversary of the l'album, Nuit de Rêve, un album of remixes was published (10 Year Anniversary Edition).

Discography

Studio albums 

 2003 : Enemy & Lovers
 2007 : Time
 2011 : Nuit de rêve
 2018 : Garden of Love

Singles and EPs 

 2017 : Sunken (Single)
 2018 : Last Dance
 2020 : Warzone - Scratch Massive Remixes

Mixes 

 2005 : Naked
 2009 : Joy

Soundtracks 

 2007 : Broken English
 2016 : Day out of Days
 2017 : Junior
 2021 : Preliminaires

Live albums 

 2008 : Underground needs your money baby
 2013 : Communion
 2021: Live in Paris

References

External links 

 

Musical groups from Pays de la Loire
French electronic music groups
French DJs